Tork Neshin Lowshan (also Romanized as Tork Neshīn Lowshān; also known as Tork Lowshān) is a village in Kalashtar Rural District, in the Central District of Rudbar County, Gilan Province, Iran. At the 2006 census, its population was 39, in 9 families.

References 

Populated places in Rudbar County